Kaiserbahnhof (Kaiser's station) refers to some private railway stations of Germany and Austria used by the Kaisers. Nowadays they are historical buildings that are part of their related modern stations.

Kaiserbahnhof may refer to the following places in Germany:

Kaiserbahnhof Bad Homburg, Bad Homburg station, Hesse
Kaiserbahnhof Göhrde, Göhrde station, Lower Saxony
Kaiserbahnhof Halbe, Halbe Bahnhof, Halbe, Brandenburg on the Berlin–Görlitz railway
Joachimsthal Kaiserbahnhof, Joachimstal, Brandenburg
Kaiserbahnhof Kierberg, Kierberg station, North Rhine-Westphalia
Kaiserbahnhof Niedermendig, Mendig station, Rhineland-Palatinate
Kaiserbahnhof Potsdam, Potsdam Park Sanssouci station, Brandenburg